Austroceratites is a genus of extinct shelled cephalopods that lived during the Triassic, included in ammonoid order Ceratitida. Within the Ceratitida, Autroceratites belongs in the family Ceratitidae and subfamily Ceratitinae.

Ceratitidae, in which Austroceratites is placed, is a mid Triassic family that has left evolute to involute, stoutly ribbed, discoidal shells with ceratitic sutures.

References 

 Austroceratites entry in The Paleobiology Database accessed 10 July 2012

Ceratitidae
Ceratitida genera
Triassic ammonites
Fossils of France